Sócrates Parri Romero (born 16 December 1966) is a Spanish former footballer who played as a defender. He began his career with Valencia, and later played 40 matches in La Liga with Albacete Balompié.

Career

Early career

Parri was born in Burjassot in the comarca of Horta Nord in the Valencian Community, and began his career with Mestalla, the reserve team of local giants Valencia. In 1986–87, he helped Mestalla earn promotion from the Tercera División, and played 37 matches in the ensuing Segunda División B season. However, Mestalla were relegated straight back to the Tercera División after just one season. He was promoted to the Valencia first team squad for the 1989–90 season, but didn't make any appearances that year, or in the following season.

At the start of the 1991–92 season, Parri made what would turn out to be his only appearance for the Valencia first team. In the away first leg of their Copa del Rey third round tie against Arnedo on 11 September, he came on for Fernando for the last 15 minutes, with Valencia already 5–0 up. They won the game 6–0 after Leonardo completed his hattrick.

Albacete Balompié

Keen for an opportunity to play first team football, Parri left Valencia to join Albacete Balompié in January 1992. Albacete were enjoying their first ever season in La Liga, and Parri made his top flight debut for the club in a 1–0 away win over Real Sociedad at Atotxa Stadium on 5 January. He made his home debut a week later as Albacete drew 1–1 with Real Zaragoza at Estadio Carlos Belmonte. He missed only one league match before the end of the season, playing 22 times. The following season, Parri made 23 appearances, and scored his only goal for the club in a 2–0 home win over Realejos in the fourth round of the Copa del Rey.

However, Albacete ended the season 17th in the league, and were forced to play a relegation playoff against Real Mallorca. Parri came on as a substitute for José María Menéndez in the home second leg, which Albacete lost 2–1, but that was still sufficient to secure and aggregate victory and maintain their La Liga status for another year. This proved to be his last match for Albacete, as he fell dramatically out of favour and didn't play at all in 1993–94, before departing at the end of the season.

Levante

Parri returned to the city of Valencia to join Levante in Segunda División B in 1994. He was never a regular starter, and had to wait until 4 February to make his debut, which came in a 1–1 home draw with Ontinyent at Nou Estadi del Llevant. He scored a single goal in his ten matches that season, in stoppage time of a 3–1 away win over Manlleu on 14 May. At the end of the season, Levante topped their group and qualified for the promotion playoffs, although they fell short of promotion by finishing third in a group topped by Écija Balompié.

Parri featured only once in the playoffs, in the opening 0–0 draw with Pontevedra at Estadio Municipal de Pasarón on 27 May, and this would prove to be his last match as a professional, as he quit football at the end of the season aged just 28.

Personal life

Parri's younger brother Líbero was also a professional footballer, playing as an attacking midfielder. Fifteen years younger than Sócrates, Líbero's career had many similarities: like his brother, he began his career with Valencia, failed to break into the first team, later had spells with both Albacete and Levante, and retired aged 28. He now works as an agent.

Honours
Mestalla
Tercera División: promotion to Segunda División B 1986–87

Valencia
La Liga runners-up: 1989–90

Levante
Segunda División B: 1994–95

Career statistics

1. Appearance in the 1992–93 La Liga relegation playoff
2. Appearance in the 1994–95 Segunda División B playoffs

References

External links

1966 births
Living people
Spanish footballers
Sportspeople from the Province of Valencia
People from Burjassot
Footballers from the Valencian Community
Association football defenders
La Liga players
Segunda División B players
Tercera División players
Valencia CF Mestalla footballers
Valencia CF players
Albacete Balompié players
Levante UD footballers